The 1877 City of Wellington by-election was a by-election held in the multi-member  electorate during the 6th New Zealand Parliament, on 27 March 1877.

The by-election was caused by the resignation of one of the two incumbent MPs, Edward Pearce, and led to his replacement by William Travers.

Results

References

Wellington 1877
1877 elections in New Zealand
1870s in Wellington
March 1877 events
Politics of the Wellington Region